"Only Love Is Real" is a song written and performed by Carole King.  The song was included on her 1976 album, Thoroughbred. The single peaked at No. 28 in the Billboard Hot 100 and was King's fourth and final No. 1 on the Easy Listening chart, where it remained for one week in March 1976.  It is ranked as the 40th biggest AC/Easy Listening hit of 1976.

Cash Box said the song has a "likable tune with a carefully constructed lyric" and that "Like Dylan, Carole King understands the power of a subtle rhyme, and she uses her knowledge in this tune with tremendous effect." Record World said that "The exceptional songwriting prowess of Carole King continues to manifest itself in quality records such as this."

Personnel
Carole King - synthesizer, piano, vocals
Danny "Kootch" Kortchmar - guitar
Russ Kunkel - drums
David Crosby - background vocals
Graham Nash - background vocals
Tom Scott - saxophone
Leland Sklar – bass
J.D. Souther - background vocals
Waddy Wachtel - guitar

Chart performance

See also
List of number-one adult contemporary singles of 1976 (U.S.)

References

1976 singles
Carole King songs
Songs written by Carole King
Ode Records singles
Song recordings produced by Lou Adler
1976 songs